Baron Wenckheim's Homecoming is a 2016 novel by László Krasznahorkai. Originally published in Hungarian by Magvető, it was later translated to English by Ottilie Mulzet and published in 2019 by New Directions Publishing. The novel employs an experimental structure, with pages-long sentences and unbroken paragraphs.

Mulzet's translation won the 2019 National Book Award for Translated Literature. The novel also won the 2017 Aegon Prize.

Plot
Baron Béla Wenckheim, a 64-year-old Hungarian man, returns to his hometown after collecting a large gambling debt in Buenos Aires, Argentina, where he was living in exile. He hopes to reunite with his childhood sweetheart Marika. However, upon hearing of his coming arrival the townspeople believe Baron Wenckheim possesses great wealth which he will bequeath to the town.

Background
In an interview with Asymptote, Krasznahorkai described the novel as a "cadenza" for his previous novels. In an interview with The Paris Review, Krasznahorkai explained: 

As with Sátántangó, The Melancholy of Resistance, and War and War, Baron Wenckheim's Homecoming features a small Hungarian town which mirrors Krasznahorkai's hometown Gyula.

Style
The novel employs an experimental structure, with pages-long sentences and unbroken paragraphs.

Publication
The novel was published in Hungarian by Magvető in September 2016. It was translated into English by Ottilie Mulzet and published on 24 September 2019 by New Directions Publishing.

Reception
Publishers Weekly gave the novel a rave review, comparing it to Krasznahorkai's Sátántangó and writing, "This vortex of a novel compares neatly with Dostoevsky and shows Krasznahorkai at the absolute summit of his decades-long project."

Kirkus Reviews gave the novel a positive review, writing, "A challenge for readers unused to endless sentences and unbroken paragraphs but worth the slog for its wealth of ideas."

Writing for The Paris Review, Dustin Illingworth praised the novel, writing, "Baron Wenkcheim's Homecoming is a fitting capstone to Krasznahorkai's tetralogy, one of the supreme achievements of contemporary literature. Now seems as good a time as any to name him among our greatest living novelists."

Andrew Singer of Trafika Europe, published in World Literature Today, gave the novel a mixed review, criticizing its prose structure and concluding, "there are even startlingly wise lessons hiding in this work—yet the overall execution feels lazy, like a draft."

References

2016 novels
Hungarian novels
Works by László Krasznahorkai
Novels set in Hungary
Postmodern novels
National Book Award for Translated Literature winning works
2016 in Hungary
Magvető books